Siri Gåsemyr Staalesen  (born 30 June 1973) is a Norwegian politician. 
She was elected representative to the Storting from the constituency of Oslo for the period 2017–2021 for the Labour Party. She was elected deputy representative to the Storting for the period 2021–2025, and replaced Espen Barth Eide from 2021 while Eide is member of the government.

She has studied history at the University of Oslo.

References

1973 births
Living people
University of Oslo alumni
Labour Party (Norway) politicians
Members of the Storting
Politicians from Oslo